The Southern Dairy Compact was an agreement between thirteen states in the southern United States. It was proposed to ensure the continued marketability of dairy producers in the member states and to supply a stable, local supply of milk products to the region. The proposed agreement was modeled on the Northeast Interstate Dairy Compact, that would allow member states to jointly establish a minimum farm price for fluid milk that is above the federally mandated minimum price level in the region.

Many southern state legislatures approved membership in the compact, however the required congressional authority to form a compact was never granted. In the 2002 Farm Bill, a support program, Milk Income Loss Contract Payments, for participating dairy farmers nationwide was enacted, allowing for subsidies when the price falls below 16.94 per cwt.

References 

United States interstate compacts
Dairy farming in the United States